Andrew W. Sidaris (February 20, 1931 – March 7, 2007) was an American television and film director, film producer, screenwriter, and actor.

Early life
Sidaris was born in Chicago, Illinois, to first-generation Greek immigrants. He grew up in Shreveport, Louisiana, graduated from C.E. Byrd High School, and attended Southern Methodist University in Dallas, Texas. His family was active in city sports circles. His brother Chris W. Sidaris (1927–2000), was the former director of the Shreveport Parks and Recreation Department.

Career
Sidaris was best known for his Bullets, Bombs, and Babes or Bullets, Bombs, and Boobs (BBB for short) series of B-movies produced between 1985 and 1998. These films featured a rotating "stock company" of actors mostly made up of Playboy Playmates and Penthouse Pets, such as Julie Strain, Dona Speir, Hope Marie Carlton, Cynthia Brimhall, Roberta Vasquez, Julie K. Smith, Shae Marks, and Wendy Hamilton. Several of his films were done wholly or largely in Shreveport, using local actors or actors with local ties.

Before doing B-movies, Sidaris worked in sports television. He directed coverage of hundreds of football and basketball games, Olympic events, and special programs and won an Emmy award for his work in the field. His best known work was with ABC's Wide World of Sports; he was the show's first director, and continued in that post for 25 years. He played a fictional television director in the 1978 action thriller Two-Minute Warning.

Sidaris pioneered what came to be known as the "honey shot", close-ups of cheerleaders and pretty girls in the stands at sporting events. He won an Emmy Award in 1969 for directing ABC Sports's coverage of the 1968 Summer Olympics. He expanded into dramatic work for television in the 1970s, directing episodes of programs like Gemini Man (1976), CBS's Kojak (mid-1970s), ABC's The Hardy Boys/Nancy Drew Mysteries (late-1970s), as well as directing ABC's Monday Night Football.

He expanded into film, specializing in "action flicks" that featured buxom gun-toting Playboy Playmates and Penthouse Pets with titles like Fit to Kill and Savage Beach. Most of Sidaris' "Triple B" series (later given the title "L.E.T.H.A.L. Ladies") were about the adventures of a team of secret agents; they were mostly filmed in Hawaii. Two entries in the series were only produced by him and were written and directed by his son, Christian. The series featured recurring characters and plots - most prominently DEA agent Donna Hamilton, who appeared in seven of Sidaris' films, and her partners Taryn and Nicole, who appeared in three and four respectively. It was common for an actor or actress who played a villain (and was killed off) in one film to appear in a subsequent film as a hero. It was also common for the same role to be recast with an actor of a completely different race or ethnicity, as was the case with recurring villain Kane, who first appeared as a Japanese-American man played by Pat Morita only to later become a white German-British man played by Geoffrey Moore.

With his wife, Arlene Terry Sidaris (née Smilowitz, b. 1941 in New York) as his production partner, Sidaris made over a dozen films and TV series. Since Sidaris' death, she runs the official websites of his films.

Death
Sidaris resided in Beverly Hills, California, with wife Arlene Sidaris until his death from throat cancer.

Selected filmography

Bibliography
 Sidaris, Andy & Arlene. Bullets, Bombs, and Babes: The Films of Andy Sidaris, Heavy Metal Press. August 2003

References

External links

Media Orchard interview (July 2006)
DVD Talk – Interview by G. Noel Gross (October 2002)
Digitally Obsessed – Interview by Rich Rosell
Associated Press Former 'Wide World of Sports' director dead at 76
Playboy Playmates, Penthouse Pets, and Parallel Realities: The Comic Book World of Cult Filmmaker Andy Sidaris

1931 births
2007 deaths
American male film actors
Film producers from Illinois
American television directors
Deaths from cancer in California
C. E. Byrd High School alumni
Deaths from esophageal cancer
American people of Greek descent
Male actors from Chicago
Actors from Shreveport, Louisiana
Writers from Shreveport, Louisiana
Film directors from Louisiana
Film producers from Louisiana
20th-century American male actors
American male screenwriters
Writers from Chicago
Screenwriters from Illinois
Screenwriters from Louisiana
20th-century American screenwriters
20th-century American male writers